Chorki may refer to:

Chorki (OTT), a Bangladeshi streaming service
Chorki (village), a village in Poland